Jock the Hero Dog (also known as Jock of the Bushveld) is a 2011 South African-American 3D computer-animated adventure comedy film directed by Duncan MacNeillie. It features the voices of Bryan Adams, Donald Sutherland, Helen Hunt, Ted Danson, Desmond Tutu, Mandy Patinkin and William Baldwin.  It is loosely based on the 1907 book Jock of the Bushveld by Sir James Percy FitzPatrick.

Plot
A pack of puppies Live on a farm in the bush field with one of them a scar face dog named Jock. One morning during a game of tug-of-war, The puppies get disturbed by a jealous old man to sell the farm and the puppies and win the bush field of the wheat. Jock tries to use his bark to defeat the old man but fails When Instead comes out as a squeaky Voice.

Later that night, Jock ventures out of the farm for something to eat and gets nearly pursued by a wolf and a vulture, but is saved by old yeller. Old yeller explains that he once had an owner named big Arlie that adopted him when he was little but died from a disease leaving him to survive on his own. The next morning, Jock once again meets the old man that also has a dog of his own O’l Bonny. They try to drown him in a bucket of water but old yeller arrives and saves Jock, and later encourages him to survive on his own when the farmer passes away. Later the farmer passes away leaving the puppies orphaned, and Jock is unable to find old yeller.

Bonnie attacks old yeller leaving him wounded and badly scarred, but jock rescues him by splashing him with The bucket of water they tried to drowned him earlier that morning. As they make a campfire for the puppies to survive the night, Jock realizes that old yeller now has a scar most likely as his as his scar was burnt when a small fire approached at the end of the barn in fall. He then falls asleep and has a dream about becoming like old yeller. The next morning, A hurricane arrives and tears up the barn while the puppies and old yeller evacuate to shelter nearby that not only causes destruction in the flatlands, but also Damages the bush field they were ment to harvest that winter. After  a sad look at the damage, Jock finds old yeller’s collar laying in one of his water bowls.

The old man and Bonnie investigate to find jock and replace him with a small puppy. Jock find old yeller and explains that his owner had not died from the disease, but needs treatment to get well. Just then the puppies end up captured by Bonnie who trap them in a bag filled with rubbish and takes the bag into the cabin. When jock and old yeller burst inside, they are shocked to find out that it was old yeller‘s old barn that he lived in before he moved out.

During the fight to save the puppies, Jock end up causing a fire that burns the whole structure. Old yeller then realizes that his owner is in the hospital room and rushes to save him. jock threatens to give Him a scar like he did to Old yeller before, But then finds old yeller Laying unconscious as a vase fell and hit him on the head. Bonnie then slowly regain his focus and rescues old yeller by pulling him out of the hospital room with his owner, Just before the cabin burns down to the ground. Jock then wakes up old yeller by licking him on the cheek before letting out a bark much to everyone’s joy.

Bonnie and old yeller are adopted in a family and the old man becomes a business partner with Old yeller’s Owner, and jock becomes the guardian dog of The farm By becoming Jock of the bushveld. In a ‘’’’post-credits’’’’ scene, The wheat is harvest after it turns golden ending with a now grown up jock winking at the viewers.

Voice cast
Bryan Adams as Jock Sir Percy Fitzpatrick
Helen Hunt as Jess
Ted Danson as Pezulu 
Desmond Tutu as Baba
Mandy Patinkin as Basil 
William Baldwin as Boatman

Reception
Common Sense Media gave the film three stars out of five.

References

External links
 
 

2011 computer-animated films
2011 films
American children's animated films
American computer-animated films
South African animated films
Films scored by Klaus Badelt
Films about dogs
Animated films about animals
2010s English-language films
2010s American films